Constantine College is a College of the University of York and was founded in 2014. It was named after the Roman emperor Constantine the Great, who was proclaimed Augustus in York in 306 AD.

Originally the college was owned in equal shares by the Evans Property Group and the university. However, in 2018 the university became the sole owner, purchasing Evans' stake for £9.8 million.

It is the most expensive college, with the cheapest accommodation starting at £166 per week. As of 2021, this made it the least popular of the colleges on East Campus.

List of Principals
The head of college of Constantine is titled the Principal.

 Rob Aitken (2014-2018); first principal
 Jeremy Jacob (2018-2019)
 Andrew Ferguson (2019–present)

Student life

Student representation 
Students at Constantine are represented by a College Student Association (CSA).

The 2023 CSA Executive Committee is:
President - Tim Woodford
Secretary - Sofia Antunes Trabuco
Treasurer - Nick Cox
VP of Sport - Liam Foxton
VP of Business, Marketing and Merchandise - Bryn Hayton
VP of Community and Wellbeing - Frederick Newell
Assistant VP of Community and Wellbeing - Imogen Shere
VP of Events and Activities - Aya Sarah Haidar

References

External links 
Constantine Students Association
Constantine College - University pages

Colleges of the University of York
2014 establishments in England
Educational institutions established in 2014